Samuel or Sam Roberts may refer to:

Politicians
Samuel D. Roberts (born 1956), member of the New York State Assembly
Sir Samuel Roberts, 1st Baronet (1852–1926), British Conservative Member of Parliament, 1902–1923
Sir Samuel Roberts, 2nd Baronet (1882–1955), British Conservative Member of Parliament, 1921–1935

Navy
Samuel B. Roberts (1921–1942), U.S. Navy coxswain killed in the Battle of Guadalcanal
Samuel Roberts (Royal Navy officer), commander of HMS Starr in the War of 1812
, a John C. Butler class destroyer escort named after the coxswain

Sportspeople
Samuel Roberts (rugby), English rugby union footballer who played in the 1880s
Samuel Roberts (1919–1940), English footballer who went by his middle name Grenville
Sam Roberts (American football) (born 1998), American football player

Other people
Sam Roberts (singer-songwriter) (born 1974), Canadian singer-songwriter
Sam Roberts (newspaper journalist) (born 1947), reporter for The New York Times and New York area pundit
Sam Roberts (radio personality) (born 1983), SiriusXM radio personality and WWE on-air personnel 
Sam Roberts, disk jockey for KZPS
Sam Roberts-Smith (born 1985), Australian operatic baritone
Samuel Roberts (Sheffield writer) (1763–1848), cutler and social campaigner
Samuel Roberts (Welsh writer) (1800–1885), Welsh political and economic writer
Samuel Roberts (mathematician) (1827–1913), British mathematician
Samuel E. Roberts (1824–1905), printer and publisher in Adelaide
Samuel J. Roberts (1907–1987), Chief Justice of the Supreme Court of Pennsylvania